Alfred Allan Goodwin  (16 December 1902 – 29 April 1950) was a British modern pentathlete. He competed at the 1928 Summer Olympics.

Personal life
Goodwin served in the Suffolk Regiment during the Second World War and was captured in Greece in 1941, spending the rest of war in prisoner of war camps in Germany. Following the war, he was made an OBE for his military service. Goodwin continued to serve and by his death in 1950, was a lieutenant colonel.

References

External links
 

1902 births
1950 deaths
British male modern pentathletes
Olympic modern pentathletes of Great Britain
Modern pentathletes at the 1928 Summer Olympics
Sportspeople from Worcester, England
British Army personnel of World War II
Suffolk Regiment officers
British World War II prisoners of war
World War II prisoners of war held by Germany
Officers of the Order of the British Empire